Jolly is an unincorporated community in Pike County, in the U.S. state of Georgia.

History
A post office called Jolly was established in 1887, and remained in operation until 1910. The community was so named for the "jolly" demeanor of its original inhabitants. A variant name is "Travelers Rest".

References

Unincorporated communities in Pike County, Georgia